The 2018 WNBA season was the 22nd season for the Las Vegas Aces franchise of the WNBA. This was the franchise's inaugural season in Las Vegas, after moving from San Antonio during the off season. The season tips off on May 20.

The team started the season slowly in May, posting an 0–4 record.  June was a month of improvement, as the Aces went 6–7, including a win over Seattle away.  July was the team's best month of the year.  The Aces posted a 6–2 record, with their only 2 losses being to Los Angeles.  The team's playoff push fell short in August, when the team posted a 2–7 record including the league's first forfeited game.  Ultimately the forfeit proved costly, as the team missed out on the playoffs by 1 game and finished 9th in the league overall.

Transactions

WNBA Draft

Trades/Roster Changes

Current roster

Game log

Pre-season

|- style="background:#bbffbb;"
| 1
| May 6
| China
| W 98–63
| Wilson (20)
| Tied (7)
| Tied (5)
| Mandalay Bay Events Center
| 1–0
|- style="background:#fcc;"
| 2
| May 13
| @ Dallas
| L 55–68
| Young (11)
| Wilson (12)
| Slaughter (3)
| College Park Center
| 1–1

Regular season

|- style="background:#fcc;"
| 1
| May 20
| @ Connecticut
| L 65–101
| Young (23)
| Wilson (10)
| Bone (3)
| Mohegan Sun Arena6,637
| 0–1
|- style="background:#fcc;"
| 2
| May 22
| @ Washington
| L 70–75
| Wilson (16)
| Wilson (8)
| Allen (6)
| Capital One Arena4,509
| 0–2
|- style="background:#fcc;"
| 3
| May 27
| Seattle
| L 98–105
| Wilson (27)
| Wilson (8)
| Allen (6)
| Mandalay Bay Events Center7,662
| 0–3
|- style="background:#fcc;"
| 4
| May 31
| @ Seattle
| L 74–101
| Wilson (21)
| Tied (6)
| Plum (6)
| KeyArena5,235
| 0–4

|- style="background:#bbffbb;"
| 5
| June 1
| Washington
| W 85–73
| Wilson (26)
| Wilson (12)
| Tied (4)
| Mandalay Bay Events Center5,575
| 1–4
|- style="background:#fcc;"
| 6
| June 3
| @ Chicago
| L 90–95
| Wilson (22)
| Park (6)
| Allen (8)
| Wintrust Arena5,052
| 1–5
|- style="background:#fcc;"
| 7
| June 8
| Atlanta
| L 83–87
| Wilson (20)
| Wilson (9)
| Allen (7)
| Mandalay Bay Events Center5,913
| 1–6
|- style="background:#fcc;"
| 8
| June 10
| @ Phoenix
| L 66–72
| Wilson (17)
| Park (11)
| Plum (6)
| Talking Stick Resort Arena8,471
| 1–7
|- style="background:#bbffbb;"
| 9
| June 12
| @ Indiana
| W 101–92 (OT)
| Wilson (35)
| Wilson (13)
| Young (9)
| Bankers Life Fieldhouse5,437
| 2–7
|- style="background:#bbffbb;"
| 10
| June 13
| @ New York
| W 78–63
| Hamby (17)
| Tied (4)
| Allen (7)
| Westchester County Center1,419
| 3–7
|- style="background:#fcc;"
| 11
| June 15
| @ Dallas
| L 67–77
| McBride (22)
| Young (9)
| Young (4)
| College Park Center4,549
| 3–8
|- style="background:#fcc;"
| 12
| June 17
| Phoenix
| L 80–92
| Wilson (21)
| Coffey (12)
| Plum (5)
| Mandalay Bay Events Center4,432
| 3–9
|- style="background:#bbffbb;"
| 13
| June 19
| @ Seattle
| W 87–77
| Wilson (25)
| Wilson (15)
| Tied (6)
| KeyArena6,395
| 4–9
|- style="background:#bbffbb;"
| 14
| June 22
| New York
| W 88–78
| McBride (27)
| Wilson (14)
| Wilson (4)
| Mandalay Bay Events Center5,478
| 5–9
|- style="background:#fcc;"
| 15
| June 24
| Minnesota
| L 73–88
| McBride (18)
| Wilson (7)
| Plum (5)
| Mandalay Bay Events Center4,814
| 5–10
|- style="background:#fcc;"
| 16
| June 27
| Dallas
| L 91–97
| McBride (38)
| Wilson (15)
| Wilson (8)
| Mandalay Bay Events Center5,246
| 5–11
|- style="background:#bbffbb;"
| 17
| June 29
| Los Angeles
| W 94–78
| Wilson (29)
| Tied (9)
| Tied (5)
| Mandalay Bay Events Center5,124
| 6–11

|- style="background:#fcc;"
| 18
| July 1
| @ Los Angeles
| L 71–87
| Young (16)
| Park (6)
| Young (8)
| Staples Center12,003
| 6–12
|- style="background:#bbffbb;"
| 19
| July 5
| Chicago
| W 84–80
| McBride (28)
| Swords (12)
| McBride (7)
| Mandalay Bay Events Center4,699
| 7–12
|- style="background:#bbffbb;"
| 20
| July 7
| Connecticut
| W 94–90
| Wilson (34)
| Wilson (14)
| Plum (10)
| Mandalay Bay Events Center3,363
| 8–12
|- style="background:#bbffbb;"
| 21
| July 10
| @ Chicago
| W 98–74
| McBride (18)
| Tied (8)
| 3 Tied (4)
| Wintrust Arena7,696
| 9–12
|- style="background:#bbffbb;"
| 22
| July 13
| @ Minnesota
| W 85–77
| McBride (24)
| Wilson (15)
| McBride (9)
| Target Center9,813
| 10–12
|- style="background:#fcc;"
| 23
| July 15
| Los Angeles
| L 78–99
| McBride (18)
| Tied (8)
| Jefferson (3)
| Mandalay Bay Events Center4,810
| 10–13
|- style="background:#bbffbb;"
| 24
| July 19
| @ Phoenix
| W 85–82
| McBride (27)
| Wilson (12)
| McBride (3)
| Talking Stick Resort Arena8,587
| 11–13
|- style="background:#bbffbb;"
| 25
| July 22
| Indiana
| W 88–74
| Wilson (24)
| Tied (10)
| 3 Tied (4)
| Mandalay Bay Events Center5,368
| 12–13

|- style="background:#fcc;"
| 26
| August 1 
| Phoenix
| L 93–104
| Wilson (29)
| 3 Tied (6)
| Tied (5)
| Mandalay Bay Events Center5,129
| 12–14
|- style="background:#fcc;"
| 27
| August 3
| @ Washington
| L via forfeit
| –
| –
| –
| Capital One Arena0
| 12–15
|- style="background:#fcc;"
| 28
| August 5
| @ Connecticut
| L 88–109
| Wilson (24)
| 5 Tied (3)
| Tied (4)
| Mohegan Sun Arena6,791
| 12–16
|- style="background:#fcc;"
| 29
| August 7
| @ Atlanta
| L 100–109
| Plum (20)
| Swords (9)
| Plum (13)
| McCamish Pavilion4,033
| 12–17
|- style="background:#fcc;"
| 30
| August 9
| Minnesota
| L 73–89
| Wilson (18)
| Swords (7)
| Young (4)
| Mandalay Bay Events Center4,497
| 12–18
|- style="background:#bbffbb;"
| 31
| August 11
| Indiana
| W 92–74
| Plum (20)
| Wilson (8)
| Tied (4)
| Mandalay Bay Events Center5,213
| 13–18
|- style="background:#bbffbb;"
| 32
| August 15
| New York
| W 85–72
| Wilson (19)
| Young (8)
| Young (4)
| Mandalay Bay Events Center7,159
| 14–18
|- style="background:#fcc;"
| 33
| August 17
| @ Dallas
| L 102–107
| Wilson (34)
| Wilson (7)
| McBride (12)
| College Park Center6,209
| 14–19
|- style="background:#fcc;"
| 34
| August 19
| Atlanta
| L 78–93
| Wilson (21)
| Hamby (8)
| Plum (8)
| Mandalay Bay Events Center5,737
| 14–20

Standings

Statistics

Regular season

Awards and honors

References

External links
The Official Site of the Las Vegas Aces

Las Vegas Aces seasons
Las Vegas Aces